The 2015–16 Portland Pilots men's basketball team represented the University of Portland during the 2015–16 NCAA Division I men's basketball season. The Pilots, led by tenth-year head coach Eric Reveno, played their home games at the Chiles Center and were members of the West Coast Conference. They finished the season 12–20, 6–12 in WCC play to finish in a three way tie for seventh place. They lost in the quarterfinals of the WCC tournament to Gonzaga.

On March 15, 2016, the school fired head coach Eric Reveno. He finished at Portland with a 10-year record of 140–178.

Previous season 
The Pilots finished the 2014–15 season 17–16, 7–11 in WCC play to finish in a three way tie for sixth place. They advanced to the semifinals of the WCC tournament where they lost to BYU. They were invited to the CollegeInsdier.com Tournament where they lost in the first round to Sacramento State.

Departures

Incoming Transfers

Recruitment

Roster

Schedule and results

|-
!colspan=9 style="background:#461D7C; color:#FFFFFF;"| Exhibition

|-
!colspan=9 style="background:#461D7C; color:#FFFFFF;"| Non-conference regular season

|-
!colspan=9 style="background:#461D7C; color:#FFFFFF;"| WCC regular season

|-
!colspan=9 style="background:#461D7C;"| WCC tournament

Source: Schedule

See also
2015–16 Portland Pilots women's basketball team

References

Portland
Portland Pilots men's basketball seasons
Portland Pilots men's basketball
Portland Pilots men's basketball
Port
Port